Nathaniel Wright  (February 13, 1785 – November 5, 1858) was an American businessman and lawyer who was the fourth Mayor of Lowell, Massachusetts.

Early life 
Wright was born in Sterling, Massachusetts on February 13, 1785, the oldest son of Hon. Thomas and Eunice (Osgood) Wright.

Family life 
Wright married Laura Hoar on March 5, 1820.

Business career 
Wright was president of the Lowell Bank from its organization, June 2, 1828, until his resignation on October 2, 1858.

Notes
 

1785 births
People from Sterling, Massachusetts
Harvard University alumni
Mayors of Lowell, Massachusetts
Massachusetts lawyers
Members of the Massachusetts House of Representatives
Massachusetts state senators
Businesspeople from Massachusetts
American bankers
1858 deaths
Lowell, Massachusetts City Council members
19th-century American politicians
19th-century American businesspeople
19th-century American lawyers